Atchison County is the name of two counties in the United States, both named for Missouri Senator David Rice Atchison:

 Atchison County, Kansas
 Atchison County, Missouri